Yergol  is a panchayat village in the southern state of Karnataka, India. It is located in the Yadgir Taluka of Yadgir district in Karnataka. It has a famous temple of Shri Gavisiddeshwara Samsthana Matha. Sanji Bheemaraya.Devastana. Uttaradi Matha, Sri Ramachandra Teertha brindavana, Ramalingeshwara Devastana. 

The Uttaradi Matha lies in the distal end of the village overlooking a vast lake . This is of particular relevance to the followers of the Madhva system of philosophy.   The brindavana (holy tomb) of Sri Ramachandra tirtha and Sri Vidya nidhi tirtha are maintained in the mutt . The Uttaradi Matha lies close to the Jayateertha Guha (Jayatirtha's Cave )  . It is widely believed  that Sri Jayatirtha wrote the Magnum opus " SrimanNyayaSudha" sitting in that Guha.  

Yergol is the only village in the gram panchayat.

Demographics
 India census, Yergol had a population of 8,132 with 4,175 males and 3,957 females.

See also
 Yadgir

References

External links
 
Balaji Medical

Villages in Yadgir district